Peck's Bad Boy is a 1934 American adventure comedy-drama film directed by Edward F. Cline. It was based on the series of books by George W. Peck.

Plot

Cast 
Jackie Cooper as Bill Peck
Thomas Meighan as Henry Peck
Jackie Searl as Horace Clay
Dorothy Peterson as Aunt Lily Clay
O.P. Heggie as Duffy
Charles E. Evans as Minister
Gertrude Howard as Martha the Maid
Larry Wheat as Master of Ceremonies
Harvey Clark as Spectator

Soundtrack 
 "Father and Son" (Music by Hugo Riesenfeld, lyrics by Herbert Stahlberg)

See also
 Peck's Bad Boy with the Circus

External links 

1934 films
1934 drama films
American drama films
American black-and-white films
Films directed by Edward F. Cline
Films produced by Sol Lesser
Fox Film films
1930s English-language films
1930s American films